The Holy Roman Emperor, originally and officially the Emperor of the Romans during the Middle Ages, and also known as the Roman-German Emperor since the early modern period, was the ruler and head of state of the Holy Roman Empire. The title was held in conjunction with the title of king of Italy (Rex Italiae) from the 8th to the 16th century, and, almost without interruption, with the title of king of Germany (Rex Teutonicorum, lit. "King of the Teutons") throughout the 12th to 18th centuries.

The Holy Roman Emperor title provided the highest prestige among medieval Roman Catholic monarchs, because the empire was considered by the Roman Catholic Church to be the only successor of the Roman Empire during the Middle Ages and the early modern period. Thus, in theory and diplomacy, the emperors were considered primus inter pares, regarded as first among equals among other Roman Catholic monarchs across Europe.

From an autocracy in Carolingian times (AD 800–924), the title by the 13th century evolved into an elective monarchy, with the emperor chosen by the prince-electors.
Various royal houses of Europe, at different times, became de facto hereditary holders of the title, notably the Ottonians (962–1024) and the Salians (1027–1125). Following the late medieval crisis of government, the Habsburgs kept possession of the title without interruption from 1440 to 1740. The final emperors were from the House of Habsburg-Lorraine, from 1765 to 1806. The Holy Roman Empire was dissolved by Francis II, after a devastating defeat by Napoleon at the Battle of Austerlitz.

The emperor was widely perceived to rule by divine right, though he often contradicted or rivaled the pope, most notably during the Investiture controversy. The Holy Roman Empire never had an empress regnant, though women such as Theophanu and Maria Theresa exerted strong influence. Throughout its history, the position was viewed as a defender of the Roman Catholic faith. Until Maximilian I in 1508, the Emperor-elect (Imperator electus) was required to be crowned by the pope before assuming the imperial title. Charles V was the last to be crowned by the pope in 1530. Even after the Reformation, the elected emperor was always a Roman Catholic. There were short periods in history when the electoral college was dominated by Protestants, and the electors usually voted in their own political interest.

Title

From the time of Constantine I (r. 306–337), the Roman emperors had, with very few exceptions, taken on a role as promoters and defenders of Christianity. The reign of Constantine established a precedent for the position of the Christian emperor in the Church. Emperors considered themselves responsible to the gods for the spiritual health of their subjects, and after Constantine they had a duty to help the Church define and maintain orthodoxy. The emperor's role was to enforce doctrine, root out heresy, and uphold ecclesiastical unity. Both the title and connection between Emperor and Church continued in the Eastern Roman Empire throughout the medieval period (in exile during 1204–1261). The ecumenical councils of the 5th to 8th centuries were convoked by the Eastern Roman Emperors.

In Western Europe, the title of Emperor in the West lapsed after the death of Julius Nepos in 480, although the rulers of the barbarian kingdoms continued to recognize the authority of the Eastern Emperor at least nominally well into the 6th century. While the reconquest of Justinian I had reestablished Byzantine presence in Italy, religious frictions existed with the Papacy who sought dominance over the Constantinople Church. Toward the end of the 8th century the Papacy still recognised the ruler at Constantinople as the Roman Emperor, though Byzantine military support in Italy had increasingly waned, leading to the Papacy to look to the Franks for protection. In 800 Pope Leo III owed a great debt to Charlemagne, the King of the Franks and King of Italy, for securing his life and position. By this time, the Eastern Emperor Constantine VI has been deposed in 797 and replaced as monarch by his mother, Irene. 

Under the pretext that a woman could not rule the empire, Pope Leo III declared the throne vacant and crowned Charlemagne Emperor of the Romans (Imperator Romanorum), the successor of Constantine VI as Roman emperor, using the concept of translatio imperii. On his coins, the name and title used by Charlemagne is Karolus Imperator Augustus. In documents, he used Imperator Augustus Romanum gubernans Imperium ("Emperor Augustus, governing the Roman Empire") and serenissimus Augustus a Deo coronatus, magnus pacificus Imperator Romanorum gubernans Imperium ("most serene Augustus crowned by God, great peaceful emperor governing the empire of the Romans"). The Eastern Empire eventually relented to recognizing Charlemagne and his successors as emperors, but as "Frankish" and "German emperors", at no point referring to them as Roman, a label they reserved for themselves.

The title of emperor in the West implied recognition by the pope. As the power of the papacy grew during the Middle Ages, popes and emperors came into conflict over church administration. The best-known and most bitter conflict was that known as the investiture controversy, fought during the 11th century between Henry IV and Pope Gregory VII.

After the coronation of Charlemagne, his successors maintained the title until the death of Berengar I of Italy in 924. The comparatively brief interregnum between 924 and the coronation of Otto the Great in 962 is taken as marking the transition from the Frankish Empire to the Holy Roman Empire.
Under the Ottonians, much of the former Carolingian kingdom of Eastern Francia fell within the boundaries of the Holy Roman Empire.

Since 911, the various German princes had elected the King of the Germans from among their peers. The King of the Germans would then be crowned as emperor following the precedent set by Charlemagne, during the period of 962–1530. Charles V was the last emperor to be crowned by the pope, and his successor, Ferdinand I, merely adopted the title of "Emperor elect" in 1558. The final Holy Roman emperor-elect, Francis II, abdicated in 1806 during the Napoleonic Wars that saw the Empire's final dissolution.

The term sacrum (i.e., "holy") in connection with the German Roman Empire was first used in 1157 under Frederick I Barbarossa.

The Holy Roman Emperor's standard designation was "August Emperor of the Romans" (Romanorum Imperator Augustus). When Charlemagne was crowned in 800, he was styled as "most serene Augustus, crowned by God, great and pacific emperor, governing the Roman Empire," thus constituting the elements of "Holy" and "Roman" in the imperial title.

The word Roman was a reflection of the principle of translatio imperii (or in this case restauratio imperii) that regarded the (Germanic) Holy Roman emperors as the inheritors of the title of emperor of the Western Roman Empire, despite the continued existence of the Eastern Roman Empire.

In German-language historiography, the term Römisch-deutscher Kaiser ("Roman-German emperor") is used to distinguish the title from that of Roman emperor on one hand, and that of German emperor (Deutscher Kaiser) on the other. The English term "Holy Roman Emperor" is a modern shorthand for "emperor of the Holy Roman Empire" not corresponding to the historical style or title, i.e., the adjective "holy" is not intended as modifying "emperor"; the English term "Holy Roman Emperor" gained currency in the interbellum period (the 1920s to 1930s); formerly the title had also been rendered as "German-Roman emperor" in English.

Succession

The elective monarchy of the kingdom of Germany goes back to the early 10th century, the election of Conrad I of Germany in 911 following the death without issue of Louis the Child, the last Carolingian ruler of Germany. Elections meant the kingship of Germany was only partially hereditary, unlike the kingship of England, although sovereignty frequently remained in a dynasty until there were no more male successors. The process of an election meant that the prime candidate had to make concessions, by which the voters were kept on his side, which was known as Wahlkapitulationen (electoral capitulation).

Conrad was elected by the German dukes, and it is not known precisely when the system of seven prince-electors was established. The papal decree Venerabilem by Innocent III (1202), addressed to Berthold V, Duke of Zähringen, establishes the election procedure by (unnamed) princes of the realm, reserving for the pope the right to approve of the candidates. A letter of Pope Urban IV (1263), in the context of the disputed vote of 1256 and the subsequent interregnum, suggests that by "immemorial custom", seven princes had the right to elect the king and future emperor. The seven prince-electors are named in the Golden Bull of 1356: the archbishop of Mainz, the archbishop of Trier, the archbishop of Cologne, the king of Bohemia, the count palatine of the Rhine, the duke of Saxony and the margrave of Brandenburg.

After 1438, the kings remained in the house of Habsburg and Habsburg-Lorraine, with the brief exception of Charles VII, who was a Wittelsbach. Maximilian I (emperor 1508–1519) and his successors no longer travelled to Rome to be crowned as emperor by the pope. Maximilian, therefore, named himself elected Roman emperor (Erwählter Römischer Kaiser) in 1508 with papal approval. This title was in use by all his uncrowned successors. Of his successors, only Charles V, the immediate one, received a papal coronation.

The elector palatine's seat was conferred on the duke of Bavaria in 1621, but in 1648, in the wake of the Thirty Years' War, the elector palatine was restored, as the eighth elector. Electorate of Hanover was added as a ninth elector in 1692. The whole college was reshuffled in the German mediatization of 1803 with a total of ten electors, a mere three years before the dissolution of the Empire.

List of emperors

This list includes all 47 German monarchs crowned from Charlemagne until the dissolution of the Holy Roman Empire (800–1806).

Several rulers were crowned king of the Romans (king of Germany) but not emperor, although they styled themselves thus, among whom were: Conrad I and Henry the Fowler in the 10th century, and Conrad IV, Rudolf I, Adolf and Albert I during the interregnum of the late 13th century.

Traditional historiography assumes a continuity between the Carolingian Empire and the Holy Roman Empire, while a modern convention takes the coronation of Otto I in 962 as the starting point of the Holy Roman Empire (although the term Sacrum Imperium Romanum was not in use before the 13th century).

Frankish emperors

On Christmas Day, 800, Charlemagne, King of the Franks, was crowned Emperor of the Romans (Imperator Romanorum) by Pope Leo III, in opposition to Empress Irene, who was then ruling the Roman Empire from Constantinople. Charlemagne's descendents from the Carolingian Dynasty continued to be crowned Emperor until 899, excepting a brief period when the Imperial crown was awarded to the Widonid Dukes of Spoleto. There is some contention as to whether the Holy Roman Empire dates as far back as Charlemagne, some histories consider the Carolingian Empire to be a distinct polity from the later Holy Roman Empire as established under Otto I in 962.

800–888: Carolingian dynasty

891–898: Widonid dynasty

896–899: Carolingian dynasty

901–905: Bosonid dynasty

915–924: Unruoching dynasty

Holy Roman Emperors
While earlier Germanic and Italian monarchs had been crowned as Roman emperors, the actual Holy Roman Empire is often considered to have begun with the crowning of Otto I, at the time Duke of Saxony and King of Germany. Because the King of Germany was an elected position, being elected King of Germany was functionally a pre-requisite to being crowned Holy Roman Emperor. By the 13th century, the Prince-electors became formalized as a specific body of seven electors, consisting of three bishops and four secular princes. Through the middle 15th century, the electors chose freely from among a number of dynasties. A period of dispute during the second half of the 13th century over the kingship of Germany led to there being no emperor crowned for several decades, though this ended in 1312 with the coronation of Henry VII, Holy Roman Emperor. The period of free election ended with the ascension of the Austrian House of Habsburg, as an unbroken line of Habsburgs held the imperial throne until the 18th century. Later a cadet branch known as the House of Habsburg-Lorraine passed it from father to son until the abolition of the Empire in 1806. Notably, from the 16th century, the Habsburgs dispensed with the requirement that emperors be crowned by the pope before exercising their office. Starting with Ferdinand I, all successive emperors forwent the traditional coronation.

962–1024: Ottonian dynasty

1027–1125: Salian dynasty

1133–1137: Supplinburg dynasty

1155–1197: Staufen dynasty

1198–1215: Welf dynasty

1220–1250: Staufen dynasty

The interregnum of the Holy Roman Empire is taken to have lasted from the deposition of Frederick II by Pope Innocent IV in 1245 (or alternatively from Frederick's death in 1250 or from the death of Conrad IV in 1254) to the election of Rudolf I of Germany (1273). Rudolf was not crowned emperor, nor were his successors Adolf and Albert. The next emperor was Henry VII, crowned on 29 June 1312 by Pope Clement V.

1312–1313: House of Luxembourg

1314–1347: House of Wittelsbach

1346–1437: House of Luxembourg

1440–1740: House of Habsburg

In 1508, Pope Julius II allowed Maximilian I to use the title of Emperor without coronation in Rome, though the title was qualified as Electus Romanorum Imperator ("elected Emperor of the Romans"). Maximilian's successors adopted the same titulature, usually when they became the sole ruler of the Holy Roman Empire. Maximilian's predecessor Frederick III was the last to be crowned Emperor by the Pope in Rome.

1742–1745: House of Wittelsbach

1745–1765: House of Lorraine

1765–1806: House of Habsburg-Lorraine

Coronation

The Emperor was crowned in a special ceremony, traditionally performed by the Pope in Rome. Without that coronation, no king, despite exercising all powers, could call himself Emperor. In 1508, Pope Julius II allowed Maximilian I to use the title of Emperor without coronation in Rome, though the title was qualified as Electus Romanorum Imperator ("elected Emperor of the Romans"). Maximilian's successors adopted the same titulature, usually when they became the sole ruler of the Holy Roman Empire. Maximilian's first successor Charles V was the last to be crowned Emperor.

See also

 Concordat of Worms
 Emperor for other uses of the title "Emperor" in Europe
 First Council of the Lateran
 Holy Roman Emperors family tree
 Holy Roman Empress
 King of the Romans
 List of German monarchs
 Holy Roman Empire
 King of Italy
 Kingdom of Italy (Holy Roman Empire)

Notes

References

External links
 

 
Holy Roman
German monarchs
Holy Roman Empire-related lists
Monarchy in Germany